Karnes may refer to:

Places 
Karnes, Norway, near Lyngseidet
Karnes City, Texas, United States
Karnes County, Texas, United States

Other uses 
Karnes (surname)
USS Karnes (APA-175), 1944 American warship

See also 
Karns (disambiguation)